Rainbow S.p.A. is an Italian studio founded by Iginio Straffi. Viacom (now known as Paramount Global) became a co-owner of the studio in 2011. Rainbow has collaborated with Viacom/Paramount's other company, Nickelodeon, on multiple shows, including Winx Club and Club 57. The studio is based in Loreto, Marche and was founded by Straffi in 1995. Rainbow began as an animation studio, providing creative services for larger companies until it secured enough funds for original productions.

In February 2011, Viacom purchased 30% of the company for 62 million euros (US$83 million), leaving the remaining 70% to Iginio Straffi. Viacom's Nickelodeon networks broadcast Rainbow's shows worldwide and Rainbow acts as the licensing agent for Nickelodeon's shows in Italy. Nickelodeon's American studios have also collaborated with Rainbow on several productions, including Winx Club from 2011 to 2015 and Club 57 in 2019.

In 2015, Rainbow purchased fellow animation studio Bardel Entertainment. In 2017, Rainbow acquired a majority stake in Gruppo Iven S.p.A., which owns the production company Colorado Film.

In 2018, Straffi and Viacom listed the company on the Italian stock exchange. The listing followed years of consideration regarding which country's stock market to enter (the United States or Italy). According to Straffi, this presented "a real dilemma" as Viacom was already listed on an American stock exchange, but Rainbow performed best in European countries. Straffi and Viacom withdrew Rainbow from the stock market in May 2018, citing a lack of suitable market conditions. 

After almost 12 years of co-ownership, Paramount sold its stake back to Straffi in January 2023. While Nickelodeon will continue to be a broadcast partner for the studio, the purchase allows Straffi full control of Rainbow's new projects. The buyout does not affect the seasons of Winx Club that Nickelodeon produced, as the copyright is still registered to Paramount.

Filmography

Television series

Films

Other divisions
Rainbow founded Tridimensional, a magazine publishing division, in 2004. A 3D animation division, Rainbow CGI, was formed in 2006. Rainbow also established Witty Toys, a toy division, in 2008.

References

Companies based in le Marche
Italian animation studios
Mass media companies established in 1995
Italian companies established in 1995
2011 mergers and acquisitions
Italian brands
Paramount Global subsidiaries
Rainbow S.r.l.
Animation studios owned by Paramount Global